French Village may refer to:

Places 
French Village, Barbados
French Village, Missouri
French Village, Nova Scotia

Arts, entertainment, and media 
Un village français (A French Village), a French television drama series

See also
:Category:Villages in France